Spyridon "Spyros" Vasdekis (born 23 January 1970) is a retired Greek long jumper.

He was born in Volos.

He won the gold medal at the 1993 Mediterranean Games, finished tenth at the 1993 World Championships, third at the 1996 European Indoor Championships and eighth at the 1997 IAAF World Indoor Championships.

His personal best jump is 8.19 metres (26 ft 10.4 in), achieved in July 1995 in Budapest. This ranks him seventh among Greek long jumpers of all time, behind Louis Tsatoumas, Miltiadis Tentoglou, Konstantinos Koukodimos, Dimitrios Filindras, Georgios Tsakonas & Dimitrios Serelis.

Spyros Vasdekis is the older brother of Olga Vasdeki.

References

External links

1970 births
Living people
Greek male long jumpers
Athletes (track and field) at the 1992 Summer Olympics
Athletes (track and field) at the 1996 Summer Olympics
Olympic athletes of Greece
Mediterranean Games gold medalists for Greece
Mediterranean Games medalists in athletics
Athletes (track and field) at the 1993 Mediterranean Games
Athletes from Volos